Seo Joon-yong (or  ; born March 14, 1988) is a South Korean cyclist, who last rode for UCI Continental team .

Major results

2008
 1st Stage 7 Tour de Korea
2012
 1st Stage 5 Tour of Thailand
2013
 8th Overall Tour de Korea
1st Stage 8
2014
 1st  Road race, National Road Championships
 6th Overall Tour de Hokkaido
1st Stage 3
2015
 1st Stage 5 Tour de Langkawi
2017
 1st Stage 5 Tour of Thailand
2018
 1st  Road race, National Road Championships
 10th Road race, Asian Road Championships

References

External links

1988 births
Living people
South Korean male cyclists
Cyclists at the 2016 Summer Olympics
Olympic cyclists of South Korea
Cyclists at the 2018 Asian Games
Asian Games competitors for South Korea
20th-century South Korean people
21st-century South Korean people